Navlata Rawat (born June 5, 1977) is an American television actress, known for her roles as Theresa Diaz on the drama series The O.C. and math prodigy Amita Ramanujan on the drama series Numb3rs.

Early life
Rawat was born in Malibu, California, to an Indian father, Rajaji Rawat, and a German mother, Claudia, née Littmann, the daughter of the President of Police (Polizeipräsident) of Frankfurt, Gerhard Littmann. She was raised in Miami, Florida. She attended Miami Country Day School and is a graduate of New York University's Tisch School of the Arts.

Career
In television, Rawat is best known for her roles as Theresa Diaz on the drama The O.C. and math prodigy Amita Ramanujan on Numb3rs. She had a guest role as Melanie in the first season of 24. Her work in film includes the science-fiction Thoughtcrimes (2003), the Project Greenlight film Feast (2005), and the independent romantic comedy Loveless in Los Angeles (2006). She has also had many smaller roles including playing Dana, a psychotic vampire slayer, in an episode of Angel and portrayed Nat Raiden on the episode "Asslane" of the short-lived action TV show, Fastlane on Fox. She played a recurring role in the USA Network series Burn Notice's fourth season. Most recently, she had a guest role on the rebooted Magnum P.I. series. 

She is the spokeswoman for Moen faucets and narrates many of their commercials.

Personal life
Rawat married actor Brawley Nolte, son of Nick Nolte, in September 2012 on the island of Tahiti. They have a daughter together.

Filmography

References

External links
 

1977 births
Living people
Actresses from Malibu, California
Actresses from Miami
American actresses of Indian descent
American film actresses
American television actresses
American people of German descent
Miami Country Day School alumni
Tisch School of the Arts alumni
20th-century American actresses
21st-century American actresses